Joanie V. Mackowski (born 1963, in Illinois) is an American poet.

Life
Mackowski grew up in Connecticut. She graduated from Wesleyan University, the University of Washington, and was a Stegner Fellow in Poetry at Stanford University. She earned a Ph.D. at University of Missouri.

Mackowski taught at University of Cincinnati.  She was an editor at Reconfigurations. Her work has appeared in Prairie schooner, Antioch Review, and Best American Poetry 2007.

Awards
 2008 Writer Magazine/Emily Dickinson Award
 2003 Kate Tufts Discovery Award
 2000 Award Series in Poetry Associated Writing Programs

Work
 "Bad Annunciation", Slate, Sept. 4, 2007
 
 
 
 
 
 View from a Temporary Window, University of Pittsburgh Press, 2010,

Anthologies
 
 David Wagoner, David Lehman, eds. "Boarding: Hemaris thysbe, The Best American Poetry 2009, Simon & Schuster, 
 David Yezzi, ed. Five Poems. The Swallow Anthology of New American Poets, OUP/Swallow Press, 2009,

Reviews
Richard Kenney wrote:

References

External links
 "Interview with Joanie Mackowski" , University of Cincinnati

1963 births
Living people
People from Illinois
Wesleyan University alumni
University of Washington alumni
Stanford University alumni
University of Missouri alumni
University of Cincinnati faculty
American women poets
21st-century American poets
American women academics
21st-century American women writers